Henry Zambrano Sandoval (born August 7, 1973) is a retired soccer player who played for the Colombia national team. He first made his name at the 1993 World Youth Cup where he was the Golden Shoe winner—the award for the best player in the tournament.  He later moved onward to senior national team, where he played between 1994 and 1999.  For his club career, he played for Atlético Nacional, MetroStars, D.C. United, Colorado Rapids and Deportes Quindío.

References

1973 births
Living people
Colombian footballers
Colombian expatriate footballers
Colombia international footballers
Colombia under-20 international footballers
1999 Copa América players
Independiente Medellín footballers
Millonarios F.C. players
Atlético Nacional footballers
Deportes Quindío footballers
América de Cali footballers
Deportes Tolima footballers
Boyacá Chicó F.C. footballers
Atlético F.C. footballers
Cortuluá footballers
New York Red Bulls players
Colorado Rapids players
Atlético Junior footballers
D.C. United players
L.D.U. Quito footballers
Deportes La Serena footballers
Colombian expatriate sportspeople in Chile
Expatriate footballers in Chile
Expatriate footballers in Ecuador
Categoría Primera A players
Chilean Primera División players
Major League Soccer players
Association football forwards
People from Atlántico Department
Footballers at the 1995 Pan American Games
Pan American Games bronze medalists for Colombia
Pan American Games medalists in football
Medalists at the 1995 Pan American Games